The Eurovision Song Contest 1973 was the 18th edition of the annual Eurovision Song Contest. Organised by the European Broadcasting Union (EBU) and host broadcaster Compagnie Luxembourgeoise de Télédiffusion (CLT), the contest was held at the Grand Théâtre on 7 April 1973 and was hosted by German television presenter Helga Guitton.

In a back-to-back victory,  won the contest again with the song "Tu te reconnaîtras" by Anne-Marie David. The winning song scored the highest score ever achieved in Eurovision under any voting format until 1975, recording 129 points out of a possible 160, which represented almost 81% of the possible maximum. This was partly due to a scoring system which guaranteed all countries at least two points from each country.

Location 

Luxembourg City is a commune with city status, and the capital of the Grand Duchy of Luxembourg. It is located at the confluence of the Alzette and Pétrusse Rivers in southern Luxembourg. The city contains the historic Luxembourg Castle, established by the Franks in the Early Middle Ages, around which a settlement developed.

The Grand Théâtre de Luxembourg, inaugurated in 1964 as the Théâtre Municipal de la Ville de Luxembourg, became the venue for the 1973 contest. It is the city's major venue for drama, opera and ballet.

Format 
The language rule forcing countries to enter songs sung in any of their national languages was dropped this year, so performers from some countries sang in English.

The orchestra was positioned on stage, behind and to the stage right of the singers, in a stacked gallery on three tiers. Giant clear tubes containing multi-coloured flowers were set on the stage left. No introductions were made for each individual entry, with the commentators providing the details of the songs and singers, speaking over a still photograph of the artists taken during the dress rehearsal shown on screen.

In light of the events that had happened during the 1972 Summer Olympics in Munich, there were fears of a terrorist threat, particularly directed against Israel's first-ever entrant, leading to unusually tight security for the contest. This gave rise to one of the best-known Eurovision anecdotes, frequently recounted by the UK's long-serving commentator Terry Wogan. He recalled that the floor manager strongly advised the audience to remain seated while applauding the performances, otherwise they risked being shot by security forces.

This contest holds the record for the most watched Eurovision Song Contest in the United Kingdom, and is also the 18th most watched television show in the same country, with an estimated 21.54 million tuning in on the night. He came 3rd with 123 points. The winner though was Anne-Marie David with "Tu te reconnaîtras". In the UK it was released in English under the title "Wonderful Dream" and released on Epic. It made number 13.

Voting 
Each country had two jury members, one aged between 16 and 25 and one aged between 26 and 55. They each awarded 1 to 5 points for each song (other than the song from their own country) immediately after it was performed and the votes were collected and counted as soon as they were cast. The juries watched the show on TV from the Ville du Louvigny TV Studios of CLT and appeared on screen to confirm their scores.

Participating countries 
Seventeen nations took part in this year's contest with Malta being drawn to perform in 6th place between Norway and Monaco, but the Maltese broadcaster withdrew before the deadline to select an entry. Austria also decided not to participate either.

Conductors 
Each performance had a conductor who directed the orchestra. The 1973 contest marked the first time that women conducted the orchestra. Monica Dominique conducted the Swedish entry and Nurit Hirsh conducted the Israeli entry.

 Ossi Runne
 Francis Bay
 
 Günther-Eric Thöner
 Carsten Klouman
 Jean-Claude Vannier
 Juan Carlos Calderón
 Hervé Roy
 
 
 Pierre Cao
 Monica Dominique
 Harry van Hoof
 Colman Pearce
 David Mackay
 
 Nurit Hirsh

Returning artists

Participants and results

Detailed voting results

10 points 
Below is a summary of all perfect 10 scores that were given during the voting.

Jury members 

Listed below is the order in which votes were cast during the 1973 contest along with the names of the two jury members who voted for their respective country. Each country announced their results in groups of three, with the final two countries voting in a group of two.

 Kristiina Kauhtio and Heikki Sarmanto
 Unknown
 José Calvário and Teresa Silva Carvalho
 Unknown
 Inger Ann Folkvord and 
 Unknown
 Teresa González and José Luis Balbín
 Paola del Medico and 
 Dušan Lekić and Ivan Antonov
 Unknown
 Unknown
 Lena Andersson and Lars Samuelson
 Unknown
 Unknown
 Catherine Woodfield and Pat Williams
 Adeline Estragnat and Danièle Heymann
 Unknown

Broadcasts 

Each participating broadcaster was required to relay the contest via its networks. Non-participating EBU member broadcasters were also able to relay the contest as "passive participants". Broadcasters were able to send commentators to provide coverage of the contest in their own native language and to relay information about the artists and songs to their television viewers.

Known details on the broadcasts in each country, including the specific broadcasting stations and commentators are shown in the tables below. In addition to the participating countries, the contest was also reportedly broadcast in Austria, Greece, Iceland, Malta and Turkey, in Bulgaria, Czechoslovakia, East Germany, Hungary, Poland, Romania and the Soviet Union via Intervision, and in Japan.

Incidents

Spanish song plagiarism allegation
After finishing second in the contest, it went on to become a huge international hit.

Concerns with lyrics
The somewhat elliptical lyrics to Portugal's entry "Tourada" provided sufficient cover for a song that was clearly understood as a blistering assault on the country's decaying dictatorship. Also, the word "breasts" was used during Sweden's song entry. However, no action was taken by the EBU.

Disagreements within the Irish delegation
An argument broke out between the singer Maxi and her  delegation over how the song should be performed. During rehearsals she repeatedly stopped performing in frustration. When it began to appear possible that Maxi might withdraw from the contest, RTÉ immediately sent over another singer, Tina Reynolds, to take her place just in case. In the end Miss Reynolds wasn't needed as Maxi did perform, with her entry earning 10th place on the scoreboard. Reynolds would perform .

Notes

References

External links

 

 
1973
Music festivals in Luxembourg
1973 in Luxembourg
1973 in music
20th century in Luxembourg City
April 1973 events in Europe
Events in Luxembourg City
Music in Luxembourg City